The Runde Bridge is a cantilever bridge that crosses the Rundasundet between the islands Remøya and Runde in the municipality of Herøy in Møre og Romsdal county, Norway. 

The  bridge carries the Fyklesvei 18 highway. Runde Bridge opened on 3 March 1982.

See also
Herøy Bridge
Remøy Bridge
Nerlandsøy Bridge
List of bridges in Norway
List of bridges in Norway by length
List of bridges
List of bridges by length

References

External links

Road Viaducts & Bridges in Norway (499-200 m)
 http://fuv.hivolda.no/prosjekt/haraldeikrem/Rundebrua.jpg
 http://www.etojm.com/Galleri/Galleri21_30/G29Runde/Rundebrua.htm
 http://www.runde.nl/content/foto_htm/b13.htm

Bridges in Møre og Romsdal
Bridges completed in 1982
Sunnmøre
1982 establishments in Norway